Rodovia Oswaldo Cruz  (official designation SP-125) is a state highway in the state of São Paulo in Brazil.

References

Highways in São Paulo (state)